Gregory Scott Chirikjian (born 1966) is an American roboticist and applied mathematician, primarily working in the field of kinematics, motion planning, computer vision, group theory applications in engineering, and the mechanics of macromolecules.
He currently serves as the head and professor at the Department of Mechanical Engineering, National University of Singapore.
Before joining NUS, he was a professor at the Johns Hopkins University.
He is well known for his theoretical contributions to the kinematics of hyper-redundant (snake-like and continuum) robots and stochastic methods on Lie groups.

Academic life 
Chirikjian received a bachelor's degree from Johns Hopkins University (JHU), Baltimore, MD, USA, in 1988, and the Ph.D. degree from the California Institute of Technology, Pasadena, CA, USA, in 1992.
In the same year, he joined the Department of Mechanical Engineering at Johns Hopkins University as an assistant professor.
He was promoted to associate professor and full professor in 1997 and 2001, respectively.
From 2004 to 2007, he was the Chair of the Department of Mechanical Engineering, Johns Hopkins University.
From 2014 to 2015, he served as a program director for the US National Robotics Initiative, which included responsibilities in the Robust Intelligence cluster in the Information and Intelligent Systems Division of CISE at the National Science Foundation (NSF).
In 2019, he joined the National University of Singapore and has been serving as the head and professor of the Department of Mechanical Engineering.

Awards and honors 
Chirikjian was named NSF's Young Investigator in 1993, Presidential Faculty Fellow in 1994, and was a recipient of the ASME Pi Tau Sigma Gold Medal in 1996.
He was elected as a fellow of ASME in 2008, and a fellow of IEEE in 2010 for his contributions to hyper-redundant manipulators.
In 2019, he received the American Society of Mechanical Engineers' Machine Design Award.

References

External links 
Gregory Scott Chirikjian at GitHub

20th-century American mathematicians
American roboticists
Applied mathematicians
Johns Hopkins University alumni
Johns Hopkins University faculty
Academic staff of the National University of Singapore
Fellow Members of the IEEE
1966 births
Living people
American expatriates in Singapore
American expatriate academics
Fellows of the American Society of Mechanical Engineers